Los Remixes 2.0 (English: The Remixes 2.0) is the second remix album and seventh album by Mexican-American cumbia group A.B. Quintanilla y Los Kumbia Kings and the second remix album by Mexican-American musician A.B. Quintanilla. It was released on April 6, 2004 by EMI Latin. It includes a cover of a song by Menudo, "Sabes a Chocolate". Los Kumbia Kings member Abel Talamántez was himself a member of Menudo before.

Track listing

Personnel

Kumbia Kings
 A.B. Quintanilla III – bass guitar, backing vocals, producer, composer
 Fernando "Nando" Domínguez III – vocals
 Frank "Pangie" Pangelinan – vocals
 Abel Talamántez – vocals
 Irvin "Pee Wee" Salinas – vocals
 Anthony "Nino B" López – backing vocals, rap (track 2), dancer
 Juan Jesús "JP" Peña – backing vocals, dancer
 Cruz Martínez – keyboards, producer, composer
 Chris Pérez – guitar
 Robert "BoBBo" Gomez III – keyboards, producer
 Noe "Gipper" / "El Animal" Nieto Jr. – accordion
 Robert "Robbie" Del Moral – drums
 Luigi Giraldo – keyboards, composer

Former Kumbia Kings members
 Jason "DJ Kane" Cano – vocals
 Francisco "Frankie J" Bautista Jr. – vocals

Additional musicians and production
 Javier Bermudez – remixer, additional producer
 Dapper Don – vocals (track 2)
 Pavel De Jesús – remixer, additional producer
 Gerardo Garmendia – photography, graphic design
 Nelson Gonzalez – art direction
 Ramiro Matos – remixer, additional producer
 Brian "Red" Moore – mixing
 Ricky Morales – art direction
 Nopal Beat – remixer, additional producer
 Ozomatli – vocals (track 12)
 ROCAsound – remixer, additional producer
 Elvin F. Torres Serrant – remixer, additional producer
 "Big Bert" Treviño – project and studio coordinator
 Don C. Tyler – mastering
 Adolfo Valenzuela – remixer, additional producer
 Omar Valenzuela – remixer, additional producer

Sales and certifications

References

2004 remix albums
Kumbia Kings albums
A. B. Quintanilla albums
Albums produced by A.B. Quintanilla
Albums produced by Cruz Martínez
EMI Records remix albums
Spanish-language remix albums
Cumbia albums
Albums recorded at Q-Productions